The Parliament of Canada Act (the Act) is an Act of the Parliament of Canada to define the rules, customs and regulations of the Parliament of Canada itself.

The Parliament of Canada was defined in the 1867 Constitution Act forming Canada. The rules were defined as following the Parliament of Great Britain and Ireland. The rules were to be updated from time to time by the Parliament of Canada, but not exceeding the Parliament of Great Britain and Ireland:

In 1875, Parliament passed the first Parliament of Canada Act, the second update to Parliament's rules, the first being "An Act to provide for oaths to witnesses being administered in certain cases for the purposes of either House of Parliament". That Act was assented to in 1868. Witnessed called under oath could be prosecuted for perjury. The oath section is now part of the current Parliament of Canada Act.

The Act has been regularly updated and continues to be updated. It was updated in January 2019.

Sections

Part I - Senate and House of Commons 
Parliament will continue upon the death of the Monarch, but this does not impinge on the right of the Crown to prorogue or dissolve Parliament. Parliament members shall have the same privileges as those of the House of Commons of Great Britain and Ireland at the time of Confederation.

Part II - Senate
In this section, rules specific to the Senate and its operation are set out.
Any Senator can be temporarily become the Deputy Speaker.
 Administrative activities of the Senate are supervised by the Standing Senate Committee on Internal Economy, Budgets and Administration. This Committee sets the regulations for senators and the Senate as a whole. The Committee also determines the suitability of any spending, goods and offices incurred by Senators.
 The Senate Ethics Officer evaluates the conduct of the Senate, has their own office and staff and reports annually on their activities. The Senate Ethics Officer and staff are immune from criminal or civil proceedings.

Part III - House of Commons
 A - Eligibility, Resignation and Vacancies
 B - Conflict of Interest
 C - Speaker, Parliamentary Secretaries, Clerk and Other Personnel
 C.1 - Caucuses
 D - Board of Internal Economy

Part IV and V
 Part IV - Remuneration of Members of Parliament
 Part V - General
 - Library of Parliament
 - Parliamentary Budget Officer
 - Parliamentary Protective Service
 - Offence and Punishment
 - Conflict of Interest and Ethics Commissioner

Schedule
This section contains the oaths to be used when examining witnesses under oath.

Source: Parliament of Canada Act R.S.C., 1985

References

External links
 Text of 1875 Act
 Current Act

Canadian federal legislation
1875 in Canada